In chemistry, a superatom is any cluster of atoms that seem to exhibit some of the properties of elemental atoms.

Sodium atoms, when cooled from vapor, naturally condense into clusters, preferentially containing a magic number of atoms (2, 8, 20, 40, 58, etc.), with the outermost electron of each atom entering an orbital encompassing all the atoms in the cluster. Superatoms tend to behave chemically in a way that will allow them to have a closed shell of electrons, in this new counting scheme.

Aluminum clusters
Certain aluminum clusters have superatom properties. These aluminium clusters are generated as anions ( with n = 1, 2, 3, … ) in helium gas and reacted with a gas containing iodine. When analyzed by mass spectrometry one main reaction product turns out to be . These clusters of 13 aluminium atoms with an extra electron added do not appear to react with oxygen when it is introduced in the same gas stream, indicating a halide-like character and a magic number of 40 free electrons. Such a cluster is known as a superhalogen. The cluster component in  ion is similar to an iodide ion or better still a bromide ion. The related  cluster is expected to behave chemically like the triiodide ion.

Similarly it has been noted that  clusters with 42 electrons (2 more than the magic numbers) appear to exhibit the properties of an alkaline earth metal which typically adopt +2 valence states. This is only known to occur when there are at least 3 iodine atoms attached to an  cluster, . The anionic cluster has a total of 43 itinerant electrons, but the three iodine atoms each remove one of the itinerant electrons to leave 40 electrons in the jellium shell.

It is particularly easy and reliable to study atomic clusters of inert gas atoms by computer simulation because interaction between two atoms can be approximated very well by the Lennard-Jones potential. Other methods are readily available and it has been established that the magic numbers are 13, 19, 23, 26, 29, 32, 34, 43, 46, 49, 55, etc.

  = the property is similar to germanium atoms.
  = the property is similar to halogen atoms, more specifically, chlorine.
 , where .
  = the property is similar to alkaline earth metals.
 , where .

Other clusters
 Li(HF)3Li = the (HF)3 interior causes 2 valence electrons from the Li to orbit the entire molecule as if it were an atom's nucleus.

 Li(NH3)4 = Has one diffuse electron orbiting around Li(NH3)4+ core, i.e., mimics an alkali-metal atom.
 Be(NH3)4 = Has two diffuse electrons orbiting around Be(NH3)42+ core, i.e., mimics He-atom.

 VSi16F = has ionic bonding.
 A cluster of 13 platinum becomes highly paramagnetic, much more so than platinum itself.
 A cluster of 2,000 rubidium atoms.

Superatom complexes
Superatom complexes are a special group of superatoms that incorporate a metal core which is stabilized by organic ligands.  In thiolate-protected gold cluster complexes a simple electron counting rule can be used to determine the total number of electrons which correspond to a magic number via,

For example the Au102(p-MBA)44 has 58 electrons and corresponds to a closed shell magic number.

Gold superatom complexes
 Au25(SMe)18− 
 Au102(p-MBA)44 
 Au144(SR)60

Other superatom complexes
 Ga23(N(Si(CH3)3)2)11
 Al50(C5(CH3)5)12
 Re6Se8Cl2 - In 2018 researchers produced 15-nm-thick flakes of this superatomic material. They anticipate that a monolayer will be a superatomic 2-D semiconductor and offer  new  2-D materials with unusual, tunable properties.
Organo− Zintl-based superatoms:[Ge9(CHO)3] and [Ge9(CHO)]

See also

 Atom cluster
 Catenation
 Metal aromaticity
 Bose–Einstein condensate
 Quantum dot

References

External links
 Designer Magnetic Superatoms, J.U. Reveles, et al. 2009
 Gold Superatom Complexes, M. Walter et al. 2008
 Gold Superatom Complexes P.D. Jadzinsky et al. 2007
 Multiple Valence Superatoms, J.U. Reveles, S.N. Khanna, P.J. Roach, and A.W. Castleman Jr., 2006
 On the Aluminum Cluster Superatoms acting as Halogens and Alkaline-earth Metals,  Bergeron, Dennis E et al., 2006
 Clusters of Aluminum Atoms Found to Have Properties of Other Elements Reveal a New Form of Chemistry, innovations report, 2005.  Have a picture of Al14.
 Clusters of Aluminum Atoms Found to Have Properties of Other Elements Reveal a New Form of Chemistry, Penn State, Eberly College of Science, 2005
 Research Reveals Halogen Characteristics innovations report, 2004.  Have pictures of Al13.

Cluster chemistry
Quantum chemistry
Atomic physics